Shadows Fall is an American metalcore band from Boston, Massachusetts, formed in 1996. Although Shadows Fall has experienced several line-up changes, for most of its recording career, Shadows Fall has been composed of Jon Donais (lead guitar, backing vocals), Matt Bachand (rhythm guitar, clean vocals), Paul Romanko (bass), Brian Fair (lead vocals), and Jason Bittner (drums).

Shadows Fall has released seven studio albums, two compilation albums, and two DVDs. The band's first album featured Philip Labonte (of All That Remains) on lead vocals; but, he was soon replaced by Fair. Shadows Fall's first two studio albums featured David Germain playing drums; however, in 2002, Bittner joined the band full-time. In February 2008, the band was a Grammy Award nominee in the category Best Metal Performance for the song "Redemption" off the album Threads of Life. Their most recent studio album, Fire From the Sky, was released on May 15, 2012 and was the first to be produced by Adam Dutkiewicz since the band's first studio release.

Shadows Fall announced in August 2014 that they were going to go on an indefinite hiatus, and by the following summer, they had wrapped up what was planned to be their farewell tour. The band reunited for its first show in six years in December 2021 in their native Massachusetts, and they have discussed the possibility of recording new material.

History

Formation and Somber Eyes to the Sky (1996–1997)
Shadows Fall was formed in 1996 by guitarists Jonathan Donais and Matt Bachand, then good friends from the local music scene. Bachand had previously been a founding member of a death metal band and Donais a member of the metalcore band Aftershock. Later on the band had found a complete lineup with the addition of Damien McPherson (vocals), Mark Laliberte (bass), and David Germain (drums). Also in 1996, Adam Dutkiewicz performed live drums to fill in for Germain. By late 1996, the band recorded and released a demo titled Mourning a Dead World, of which only about 200 copies were produced. It consisted of the songs Lifeless, Suffer the Season, Fleshold, Forever Lost, A Souls Salvation, and Deadworld. McPherson decided to leave the band, and was replaced by Philip Labonte in 1997. Around the same time, bass guitarist Paul Romanko, formally of the hardcore band Pushbutton Warfare, was recruited as a permanent replacement for Laliberte, who had originally joined on a temporary basis. Now with a more solid lineup, the band released its first EP, To Ashes, with Dutkiewicz playing as a session drummer. The band's name, according to Bachand, comes from the title of a comic book published in the early 1990s.

Shadows Fall toured the New England area opening for artists such as Fear Factory and Cannibal Corpse. On November 30, 1997 the band released its first studio album Somber Eyes to the Sky, through Bachand's recording label, Lifeless Records.

Of One Blood (1998–2000)

In 1998, Labonte was asked to leave the band due to personal and artistic differences. He had ideas for a side project while a member of the band, and went on to form All That Remains. The band looked for a replacement vocalist and eventually recruited Milford, MA native Brian Fair of the pioneering metalcore band Overcast. The band had been friends with Fair for years. After a US Summer tour with Shai Hulud, Overcast disbanded and the band asked Fair if he would like to join Shadows Fall. While on tour Shadows Fall was signed to Century Media Records. The band recorded its second studio album Of One Blood with Fair on vocals in 2000, and the release included re-recorded songs from Somber Eyes to the Sky. In 2001, David Germain decided to leave the band due to alcoholism, and was replaced by former Stigmata and Burning Human drummer Jason Bittner.

The Art of Balance (2001–2003)
Due to repeated comparisons with Gothenburg melodic death metal bands, Shadows Fall decided to change its style to find its own sound. Inspired by more thrash, hard rock and power ballad influences, the band recorded its third studio album, titled The Art of Balance. Released on September 17, 2002, the album peaked at number 15 on the Billboard Top Independent albums chart. Shadows Fall released three music videos to promote the album; "Thoughts Without Words", "Destroyer of Senses", and "The Idiot Box". The Art of Balance featured a cover of the Pink Floyd song "Welcome to the Machine." Andy Hinds of AllMusic stated the album is "a modern heavy metal album that is both brutal and highly musical, traditional yet forward-thinking", but criticized the placement of "Welcome to the Machine", stating the song "is stylishly well-executed, but seems a tad out of place nonetheless." Shadows Fall supported The Art of Balance by touring on Ozzfest in 2003.

The War Within (2004–2006)
Shadows Fall released its fourth studio album The War Within on September 21, 2004. It was the first release to enter the Billboard 200 for the band at number 20, and peaked at number one on the Top Independent albums chart. In promotion for the album, Shadows Fall released four music videos over the course of one year; "The Power of I and I", "What Drives the Weak", "Inspiration on Demand", and "Enlightened By the Cold". The song "What Drives the Weak" received a Grammy Award nomination for Best Metal Performance in 2006, however the award went to Slipknot for the song "Before I Forget". "The Light That Blinds" was featured in the video game Guitar Hero II. Wade Kergan of AllMusic praised the album stating the band has "grown beyond the confines of the metal-loving hardcore crowd anyway, with more in common now with the classic thrash of Metallica than the metal-tinged hardcore of Coalesce". In support of the album the band once again performed on Ozzfest, but this time as a mainstage act. As of 2008, the album has sold almost 400,000 copies in the United States.

Shadows Fall released its first DVD The Art of Touring in November 2005. The DVD included a live concert, backstage footage, and six music videos. The band released its final CD on Century Media Records, titled Fallout from the War on June 13, 2006. Released as a compilation album, it debuted at number 83 on the Billboard 200. Fallout from the War included tracks recorded for The War Within that did not make it on to the album, b-sides, re-recordings, and cover songs. David Jeffries of AllMusic claimed the album is "a great informal introduction to the ferocious and melodic witches' brew Shadows Fall always seems to nail."

Threads of Life (2007–2008)
Shadows Fall signed a deal with Atlantic Records to distribute the band's albums in the United States, and a deal with Roadrunner Records for international distribution. The band released its fifth studio album Threads of Life on April 3, 2007. "Redemption", the first single from the CD was released on February 20, 2007 through iTunes with an accompanying music video. "Redemption" received a Grammy Award nomination for Best Metal performance; the award ceremony as held on February 10, 2008, but Slayer's "Final Six" won the award. Thom Jurek of AllMusic stated Shadows Fall has "lost none of the fire, attack or attitude" on Threads of Life. Jurek also said the album featured "killer guitar breaks, big fat chugging riffs, power-slam skin work, cattle prod bass, and cool little hooks and melodic touches on top of those bludgeoning riffs make Threads of Life a major label debut of merit, and a metal record worthy of celebrating." Keith Bergman of Blabbermouth.net stated "Threads of Life is slick as hell."

Shadows Fall toured in support of Threads of Life, including making appearances at the Jägermeister tour with Stone Sour and Lacuna Coil, the Operation Annihilation tour with Static-X, 3 Inches of Blood, and Divine Heresy, and the Black Crusade tour with Trivium, Machine Head, DragonForce, and Arch Enemy. The band was a part of the Soundwave tour in Australia and in Asia in February 2008, along with Killswitch Engage, As I Lay Dying, and Bleeding Through.

Retribution (2009–2011)
Shadows Fall released their sixth album, Retribution, on September 15, 2009, through the band's own label, Everblack Industries, which was created in conjunction with Warner Music Group's ILG, Ferret Music and ChannelZERO Entertainment. It is being released in the UK via Spinefarm Records. The album was produced by Chris "Zeuss" Harris. Drummer Jason Bittner recently stated about the band's new material, "The songs are a little more on the darker, angry side... lots of heaviness, lots of crazy guitar, and LOTS of room for me to have some fun. There is no doubt in my mind that this will be the best performance of my career, so far, and I owe that to my guys for bringing me incredible riffs to write killer drum parts to." As of the fall of 2009 the band was appearing on the 'Shock & Raw' tour of North America with 2Cents, Otep & Five Finger Death Punch. After a South American tour, Shadows Fall will be playing on the Jägermeister Stage in the 2010 Rockstar Mayhem Festival in July and August 2010. The band is also scheduled to support Lamb of God on their Australian tour in December 2009 Shadows Fall is pleased to announce their first and only New York City performance this year, taking place at Santos Party House on December 18, 2010 with direct support from Thy Will Be Done.

Shadows Fall released a live CD/DVD, Madness in Manila: Shadows Fall Live in The Philippines 2009, on October 26.

Fire from the Sky, final tours and hiatus (2012–2020)
In late 2011, Shadows Fall entered the studio to begin recording their seventh studio album. While in the studio, they held live video streams to discuss the progress of the album and answer questions from fans. This album is the first to be produced by Adam Dutkiewicz since the band's original studio release, Somber Eyes to the Sky. Fire from the Sky was released on May 15, 2012 through Razor & Tie.

In late 2012, the band headlined the Party To The Apocalypse 2012 tour with God Forbid starring Shadows Fall, God Forbid, Thy Will Be Done and Trumpet The Harlot.

On January 11, 2013, it was announced that guitarist Johnathan Donais would be joining Anthrax on their upcoming Metal Alliance Tour and on August 13, 2013 Donais was confirmed as a full Anthrax member.

On June 28, 2014, Shadows Fall performed with the bands Black Fast, Dead by Wednesday, Hallow Point, and Gray's Divide in St. Louis, Missouri.

On August 25, 2014, the band announced several final tours to take place in Europe and North America so the band could take a hiatus from future extensive touring. This farewell tour lasted into the summer of 2015.

In December 2014, it was announced drummer Jason Bittner would join Arizona thrash metal band Flotsam and Jetsam, and he is currently the drummer for Overkill. Guitarist Matt Bachand left to join Act of Defiance, along with the former members of Megadeth. Matt Bachand is currently in American metal band, Living Wreckage with former Shadows Fall guitarist Jon Donais.

Reunion (2021–present)
In a May 2021 interview on the Who's Your Band? music podcast, drummer Jason Bittner revealed that Shadows Fall had "tried to get together last year for a reunion", and they were planning to play one of their first shows in over half a decade at the Worcester Palladium. He also commented on the possibility of new material and further band activity: "We're not gonna say we're still gonna be on hiatus, but we're not gonna say we're active either. We wanna just try to play a show. That's the point of right now — can we play a show first, and then everything else that comes after that, like talk of writing a record or talk of writing an EP… We've already talked about this — we said, if anything, we would write an EP first. We wouldn't write a full-length; we'd probably just four-song increments or something."

On June 22, 2021, vocalist Brian Fair confirmed that Shadows Fall were reuniting for their first show in over half a decade at the Worcester Palladium on December 18. Supporting acts for this show were Unearth, Darkest Hour, Within the Ruins, Sworn Enemy and Carnivora.

In December 2021, when asked by the Podioslave Podcast if there will be new music from Shadows Fall, Fair said, "We've talked about writing stuff, and there's a very definitive Shadows Fall approach to writing. So if Matt or Jon or Paul had ideas that really made sense, I'd see us pursuing 'em. But nothing right now. All we wanted to do is get through this show — we wanted to get through it, see if we could pull it off, see how it went. And now we're, like, 'Okay, now we can think about if we wanna do something else.' But nothing planned right now. I know Jon and Matt are riff machines — I'm sure they've got stuff — but they do also have other projects they're working on too… But right now we're just kind of recovering a little bit, trying to make sure I get my neck back in shape."

Musical style

Shadows Fall has been mainly described as metalcore, death metal and thrash metal.

Tom Murphy of Westword opines that "Shadows Fall began as a melodic death-metal band with some roots in hardcore". Murphy notes that on the 2002 album The Art of Balance, the band started to incorporate thrash metal into their sound.

Steve Huey of AllMusic compared Shadows Fall's style to Gothenburg death metal, with the band In Flames being a notable influence.

Band members

Official current members
 Jon Donais – lead guitar, backing vocals (1996–2015, 2021–present)
 Matt Bachand – rhythm guitar, clean vocals (1996–2015, 2021–present)
 Paul Romanko – bass (1997–2015, 2021–present)
 Brian Fair – lead vocals (1999–2015, 2021–present)
 Jason Bittner – drums (2001–2015, 2021–present)

Former members

Lead vocalists
 Damien McPherson – lead vocals (1996)
 Philip Labonte – lead vocals (1997–1999)

Bassists
 Mark Laliberte – bass (1996–1997)
Ed Lanouette – touring bass (2012)
Mike Turbayne – touring bass (2013–2014)

Drummers
 David Germain – drums (1996–2000)
Adam Dutkiewicz – session drums (1996)
 Derek Kerswill – drums (2000–2001)
Willis Mathiasen – touring (2012)

Lead guitarist
Felipe Roa – touring lead guitar (2013–2014)

Timeline

Awards and nominations

Grammy Awards

|-
| 2006 || "What Drives the Weak" || Best Metal Performance || 
|-
| 2008 || "Redemption" || Best Metal Performance || 

Boston Music Awards

|-
| 2007 || Shadows Fall || Outstanding Metal/Hardcore Band of the Year || 
|-
| 2007 || Shadows Fall || Act of the Year || 
|-
| 2007 || Threads of Life || Album of the Year (Major) || 

Metal Hammer Golden Gods Awards

|-
| 2003 || Shadows Fall || Best Underground Act ||

Discography

Studio albums

Demos

Compilation albums

Video albums

Singles

Music videos

References

External links

Official website
 Shadows Fall bass player Ed Lanouette talks about joining the band and current your tour
Brian Fair interview on Revelator talking upcoming 2013 fall tour and new Death Ray Vision Album

American melodic death metal musical groups
Metalcore musical groups from Massachusetts
American thrash metal musical groups
Atlantic Records artists
Heavy metal musical groups from Massachusetts
Musical groups established in 1996
Musical groups disestablished in 2014
Musical groups reestablished in 2021
Musical groups from Boston
Roadrunner Records artists
Ferret Music artists